The Doorbraak ("Breakthrough") was a Dutch short-term political movement after World War II, with the stated goal of renewing the politics of the Netherlands by coalescing progressive liberals, Christian democrats and social democrats in a single progressive political party. In the process, the movement sought to 'break through' the pillarisation in Dutch politics. This led to the creation of the modern day Labour Party.

Background 
After World War II, there was widespread feeling amongst progressives that the pillarised political system should be broken open. No longer should Catholics vote for the Roman Catholic State Party simply because they were Catholic or Reformed people for the Anti-Revolutionary Party simply because they were Reformed. Instead, political issues should structure the political system. The progressives were united in their vision of a democratic socialist Netherlands.

In order to force this breakthrough, the Social Democratic Workers' Party, the left-liberal Free-thinking Democratic League and the Christian socialist Christian Democratic Union united to form the Labour Party, a progressive party open to all people. The new party did not, however, gain enough support from Catholics or Reformed adherents. Much of the liberal wing left in 1948 and joined with the conservative liberal Freedom Party to form the People's Party for Freedom and Democracy. The PvdA became encapsulated in the socialist pillar.

In 1966, social liberal Democrats 66 attempted another breakthrough of the pillarised political system, again unsuccessfully.

References

Political history of the Netherlands
Labour Party (Netherlands)
Aftermath of World War II in the Netherlands